Lutrochus arizonicus is a species of travertine beetle in the family Lutrochidae. It is found in North America.

References

 Brown, Harley P., and Chad M. Murvosh (1970). "Lutrochus arizonicus New Species, with Notes on Ecology and Behavior (Coleoptera, Dryopoidea, Limnichidae)". Annals of the Entomological Society of America, vol. 63, no. 4, 1030–1035.

Further reading

 Arnett, R.H. Jr., M. C. Thomas, P. E. Skelley and J. H. Frank. (eds.). (2002). American Beetles, Volume II: Polyphaga: Scarabaeoidea through Curculionoidea. CRC Press LLC, Boca Raton, FL.
 
 Richard E. White. (1983). Peterson Field Guides: Beetles. Houghton Mifflin Company.

Byrrhoidea